HTM Personenvervoer NV (HTM, from the former name Haagsche Tramweg Maatschappij) is a public transport company in the Netherlands operating trams, lightrail and buses in The Hague, Rijswijk, Leidschendam, Voorburg, Delft, Zoetermeer, Wateringen, Pijnacker and Nootdorp, the so-called Conurbation Haaglanden. The lightrail connection (called RandstadRail, RR) to Zoetermeer is operated in cooperation with RET, the Rotterdam-public transport company, which operates the connection between The Hague Central Station and Slinge in the south of Rotterdam, thus giving a fast and easy connection between the two city-centres.
Regional transports are serviced by Connexxion, Arriva and RET.

In September 2012 it was announced that Dutch Railways (NS) wanted to acquire a 49% stake in HTM. The initiative came from HTM and was received positively by the (then) sole shareholder in HTM, the municipality of The Hague. The House of Representatives was less positive, VVD parliament member Aukje de Vries, for example, felt that "a state-owned company should not step further into a market where it has been agreed that the market must do its job." On 5 April 2013, the city council of The Hague approved the proposal, with NS paying €45 million for the shares.

Because on 15 October 2013 the NS took a 49% stake in HTM, and was 100% shareholder of Qbuzz, the HTMbuzz shares were once again fully owned by HTM. The NS remained co-owner of HTMbuzz, through HTM, for almost half of this shift in shares.

On 6 July 2016 it was announced that the municipality of The Hague wanted to buy back the shares of HTM from NS, which announced that it would continue to work together with the municipality and HTM on better traffic.

Since 7 December 2016, the HTM shares have been held by the municipality of The Hague again and MRDH has a share with special rights.

On this date, HTM also obtained the rail concession for public transport in the region of The Hague for the period from 2016 to 2026. On 17 May 2017, the Metropolitan Region of Rotterdam The Hague announced that it would give HTM the allocation of bus transport in the Hague region. On 8 December 2019, the bus concession officially takes effect and applies for the period 2019 - 2034.

From 9 December 2012 till 9 December 2018, citybus-services were, as mentioned, run by HTMbuzz, a joint-venture of HTM and Qbuzz, regional transports being serviced by Veolia, Arriva and RET. Fares on the network fall under the National Tariff System. Since 9 December 2018 HTMbuzz changed the name in HTM, as it used to be till 9 December 2012.

Since 2004 there is a tram tunnel with two underground tramstations (Spui and Grote Markt) in The Hague city centre; it is shared by tramline 6 and RR-lines 2, 3 and 4.

Trams & LRVs:
 600 volt DC-series: 70 GTL8-trams and 40 Avenio-trams;
 600 & 750 volt DC-series: 72 LRVs called RegioCitadis.

HTM once owned shares in SVD, the city bus company of Dordrecht. However, HTM has sold its shares because the ministry of transport and public works opposed the company competing for public transport concessions in tenders. In addition to this Arriva took over the service as of January 1, 2007, due to a better offer.

Tram and light rail lines

Line 1 (red) 
 Vehicle type: GTL-8

Line 2 (yellow) 
 Vehicle type: Avenio and, occasionally, RegioCitadis
 Operated as R-net or, occasionally, as RandstadRail.

 And Line 2: Den Haag Kraayenstein - Den Haag Laan van NOI railway station (additional trams rush hours only)

Line 3 (purple) 
 Vehicle type: RegioCitadis
 Operated by RandstadRail as tram-trains.

 And Line 3: Den Haag De Savornin Lohmanplein - Den Haag Centraal railway station (additional tramtrains rush hours only)

Line 4 (orange) 
 Vehicle type: RegioCitadis
 Operated by RandstadRail as tram-trains.

 And Line 4: Den Haag Monstersestraat - Lansingerland-Zoetermeer (additional (double) tramtrains rush hours only)

Line E 
 Vehicle type: RSG3
 Operated by RET of Rotterdam as part of Randstadrail and the underground/subway-system of Rotterdam

Line 6 (sky blue) 
 Vehicle type: GTL-8

Line 9 (yellow green) 
 Vehicle type: Avenio
 Operated as R-net.

 And Line 9: Madurodam - Vrederust (additional trams rush hours only)

Line 11 (brown) 
 Vehicle type: Avenio
 Operated as R-net.

Line 12 (pink) 
 Vehicle type: GTL-8

Line 15 (violet) 
 Vehicle type: Avenio
 Operated as R-net.

Line 16 (dark brown) 
 Vehicle type: GTL-8, occasionally Avenio
company : occasionally r-net Started May 2022

Line 17 (dark blue) 
 Vehicle type: Avenio
 Operated as R-net.

Line 19 (dark green) 
 Vehicle type: RegioCitadis and, occasionally, Avenio
 Operated as RandstadRail or, occasionally, as R-net.

City Bus lines 
 20 Den Haag Duinzigt - Den Haag Centraal railway station
 21 Den Haag Vrederust - Scheveningen Noord
 22 Den Haag Duindorp - Rijswijk De Schilp via Den Haag Centraal railway station
 23 Den Haag Kijkduin - Scheveningen Noord via Rijswijk, Voorburg and Benoordenhout (Service between Kijkduin and Colijnplein restricted to weekends from May till September and during summer holidays)
 24 Den Haag Kijkduin - Den Haag Mariahoeve railway station
 25 Den Haag Grote Markt - Den Haag Vrederust
 26 Den Haag Kijkduin - Den Haag HS railway station - Voorburg railway station (Restricted evening- & weekendservice between Kijkduin and The Hague HS)
 27 Den Haag Randveen - Den Haag Mariahoeve railway station via Den Haag HS railway station en Den Haag Centraal railway station (Weekdays, rush hours only)
 28 Den Haag Zuiderstrand - Voorburg railway station via Den Haag Centraal railway station, operated with electric buses
 29 Rijswijk railway station - Den Haag Oude Waalsdorperweg (Weekdays, rush hours only)

Nightlines 
 N1 Centrum Binnenhof - Scheveningen via Den Haag Mariahoeve.
 N2 Centrum Binnenhof - Voorburg, Leidschendam, Voorschoten & Wassenaar.
 N3 Centrum Binnenhof - Den Haag Kraayenstein via Den Haag Loosduinen.
 N4 Centrum Binnenhof - Rijswijk via Wateringen.
 N5 Centrum Binnenhof - Delft via Ypenburg and Nootdorp; in Nootdorp connection with line B10 of the Rotterdam nightservice.
 N6 Centrum Binnenhof - Zoetermeer via Den Haag Leidschenveen, Zoetermeer Centrum and Zoetermeer Rokkeveen.

The nightlines are circular and operate on Friday- and Saturdaynights only.

Equipment

See also 
 RandstadRail
 Trams in The Hague

References

External links 
 HTM official website
 Photographs of HTM trams & busses, old and new
 Picture of the Avenio-tram
 Website of Randstadrail-project

Intermodal transport authorities
Transport companies of the Netherlands
Tram transport in the Netherlands
Light rail in the Netherlands
Transport in The Hague
Companies based in The Hague